= The Bloomsbury Cookbook =

2014 book by Jans Ondaatje Rolls

The Bloomsbury Cookbook: Recipes for Life, Love and Art
- First edition
- Author: Jans Ondaatje Rolls
- Language: English
- Publisher: Thames & Hudson
- Publication place: United Kingdom

The Bloomsbury Cookbook : Recipes for Life, Love and Art is a 2014 book by British author Jans Ondaatje Rolls, published by Thames & Hudson.

== Synopsis ==
The Bloomsbury Cookbook is described by the publishers as "Part cookbook, part social and cultural history". It tells the story of the Bloomsbury Group through chapters with food-related titles and featuring sketches, paintings, photographs, letters and handwritten notes, and original quotations.

== Reception ==
In The Daily Telegraph Frances Wilson wrote that "The Bloomsbury Cookbook has refreshed a dish that was once again starting to taste bland by putting life back on a plate". In The Guardian Rachel Cooke wrote that the book was her "find of the year so far" and that she "was struck all over again by how powerfully food connects us to others, even those we never met – and by what it reveals of our personalities" The book furthermore attracted praise in The Independent and The Spectator. The book was also featured in a piece of the BBC website
